In mathematics, the Cramér–Wold theorem in measure theory states that a Borel probability measure on  is uniquely determined by the totality of its one-dimensional projections. It is used as a method for proving joint convergence results. The theorem is named after Harald Cramér and Herman Ole Andreas Wold.

Let
 
and

be random vectors of dimension k. Then  converges in distribution to  if and only if:

 

Footnotes

References

External links 
 Project Euclid: "When is a probability measure determined by infinitely many projections?"

Theorems in measure theory
Probability theorems
Convergence (mathematics)